Dominick Cruz (born March 9, 1985) is an American professional mixed martial artist, sports analyst and commentator. He currently competes in the Bantamweight division in the Ultimate Fighting Championship (UFC), where he is a former two-time UFC Bantamweight Champion. Cruz has also competed for World Extreme Cagefighting (WEC), and was the promotions final WEC Bantamweight Champion. As of December 6, 2022, he is #7 in the UFC bantamweight rankings.

Cruz is noted for his unorthodox movement, powerful wrestling base, quick striking, and his tendency to attack from angles in a fashion unlike any other fighter on the UFC roster. He won the WEC bantamweight title in March 2010, and won the inaugural UFC Bantamweight Championship the following December. After defending the belt twice in 2011, Cruz was sidelined by injuries in 2012 and subsequently stripped of the title in 2014. On January 17, 2016, he regained the bantamweight championship with a split-decision win over T.J. Dillashaw. Numerous media outlets called this victory the greatest comeback story in MMA history.

Early life
Cruz was born in San Diego, California, and is of Mexican descent. He lived with his single mother, grandmother, and brother in a trailer park in Tucson for most of his childhood. He started wrestling in seventh grade and competed all through high school out of Flowing Wells High School. After an injury that came in his senior year, he lost the opportunity of receiving a scholarship to wrestle at the University of Northern Colorado. Cruz worked as a customer service representative at Lowe's, and was studying to be a firefighter at community college before becoming a full time fighter.

Mixed martial arts career

Early career 
Cruz began his professional mixed martial arts (MMA) career in 2005, competing in the Rage in the Cage and Total Combat organizations. He amassed a record of 9–0 before joining World Extreme Cagefighting (WEC).

World Extreme Cagefighting
His first fight in the WEC was at featherweight at WEC 26 in a title fight against Urijah Faber in which he lost by guillotine choke in the first round. The fight would become the beginning of a longstanding cantankerous rivalry between the two.

He would then make his debut for the WEC's 135 lb bantamweight division on June 7, 2008, at WEC 34 defeating Charlie Valencia by unanimous decision.

Cruz went on to take decision victories against Ian McCall on January 25, 2009, at WEC 38 and April 5, 2009, Ivan Lopez at WEC 40.

Cruz defeated Joseph Benavidez on August 9, 2009, at WEC 42 by unanimous decision. Both participants were awarded Fight of the Night honors.

WEC Bantamweight Championship
Riding a four-fight win streak, Cruz was presented with a title shot against the reigning WEC Bantamweight Champion Brian Bowles. The bout took place at WEC 47 on March 6, 2010. Cruz won the bout via TKO after Bowles was unable to continue after the second round after breaking his hand. Cruz became the new WEC Bantamweight Champion.

Cruz made his first title defense against Joseph Benavidez on August 18, 2010, at WEC 50.  Cruz broke his left hand in the fight. The bout was a rematch of their contest at WEC 42, in which Cruz handed Benavidez his first career loss, via decision. Cruz defeated Benavidez again via split decision and retained his title.

Cruz faced Scott Jorgensen on December 14, 2010, at WEC 53 for both the WEC Bantamweight Championship and the newly created UFC Bantamweight Championship. This bout would be the final Bantamweight Championship fight under the WEC banner and would also crown the inaugural UFC Bantamweight champion, making this the only UFC title fight to take place outside of the UFC. Cruz defeated Jorgensen via unanimous decision to retain the WEC Bantamweight Championship and become the first UFC Bantamweight Champion.

Ultimate Fighting Championship

Bantamweight Championship 
On October 28, 2010, World Extreme Cagefighting merged with the Ultimate Fighting Championship (UFC). As part of the merger, all WEC fighters were transferred to the UFC.

A rematch with Urijah Faber took place on July 2, 2011, at UFC 132 being the first defense of the new UFC Bantamweight title. In a closely contested fight which saw Faber drop Cruz multiple times with strikes and Cruz landing multiple leg\body kicks, knees and takedowns, Cruz defeated Faber via unanimous decision to retain his championship and avenge the only loss on his record at that time.

Cruz defeated Demetrious Johnson via unanimous decision on October 1, 2011, at UFC on Versus 6, his second UFC title defense. Cruz broke his right hand in the first round. Cruz was expected to face Urijah Faber for a third time for the UFC bantamweight championship after Faber defeated Brian Bowles at UFC 139 in a bantamweight title eliminator bout.

String of injuries 
In December 2011, Cruz was selected to coach The Ultimate Fighter: Live against opposing coach Urijah Faber. The rubber match between Cruz and Faber was expected to take place on July 7, 2012, at UFC 148. However, on May 7, 2012, Cruz was forced to pull out of the bout citing a torn ACL.

On December 3, 2012, it was revealed that Cruz underwent another ACL surgery after his body rejected one from a cadaver, with an expected recovery time of six to nine months.

Cruz was scheduled to make his return on February 1, 2014, at UFC 169 in a unification bout with interim UFC Bantamweight Champion Renan Barão. However, on a January 6 episode of SportsCenter, UFC president Dana White announced that Dominick Cruz had torn his groin and vacated the UFC Bantamweight Championship; White promoted Barão to undisputed UFC Bantamweight Champion, and announced that Barão's first unified title defense would be against Urijah Faber at UFC 169.

After nearly three years away from the sport due to injuries, Cruz returned to the octagon on September 27, 2014, at UFC 178 where he faced Takeya Mizugaki. Cruz won the fight by KO in the first round by punches after getting a takedown. The win also earned Cruz his first Performance of the Night bonus award. At the post-fight press conference, Dana White confirmed that Cruz's next fight would be for the Bantamweight Championship against T.J. Dillashaw.

Subsequently, on December 22, 2014, Cruz indicated that he had torn the ACL in his other knee, which sidelined him through 2015.

Regaining the championship 
After over four years since his last title fight, Cruz faced T.J. Dillashaw on January 17, 2016, at UFC Fight Night 81. He regained the title with a split-decision victory. Both participants were awarded Fight of the Night honors. Many have cited the return and victory as one of the greatest comebacks in MMA history.

To complete their trilogy, Cruz defended his title against Urijah Faber on June 4, 2016, at UFC 199. He won the fight by unanimous decision.

Injuries and losing the title 
Cruz faced Cody Garbrandt on December 30, 2016, at UFC 207. After getting knocked down multiple times during the bout, Cruz lost the bout by unanimous decision. This was the first loss for Cruz in nearly 10 years. Months later, on The Joe Rogan Experience, Cruz revealed that he was plagued by plantar fascia tendinitis throughout training camp that made it difficult for him to walk at times.

Cruz was expected to face Jimmie Rivera on December 30, 2017, at UFC 219, however, on November 8, it was reported Cruz suffered a broken arm and he was forced to pull from the card.

Cruz was expected to face John Lineker on January 26, 2019 at UFC 233. It was reported on December 11, 2018 that Cruz injured his shoulder and pulled out of the fight. Subsequently, Cruz indicated that he expects to be out of competition for another year.

After more than a 3 year-layoff, Cruz replaced José Aldo and faced Henry Cejudo for the UFC Bantamweight Championship on May 9, 2020 at UFC 249. Cruz lost via TKO in the second round.

Cruz faced Casey Kenney on March 6, 2021 at UFC 259. He won the fight via split decision.

Cruz faced Pedro Munhoz on December 11, 2021 at UFC 269. He won the fight via unanimous decision despite getting knocked down twice during the opening round. The bout earned the Fight of the Night bonus award.

Cruz faced Marlon Vera on August 13, 2022 at UFC on ESPN 41. He lost the fight by knockout via a head kick in round four.

Fighting style
Considered to be one of the best MMA fighters of his generation, Cruz combines constant lateral motion with precise, in-and-out striking. Known as one of the most agile fighters in MMA, he is noted for his quick footwork, head movement, and use of feints. He often attacks with combinations, step-in jabs, and single strikes thrown from all angles. In addition to his striking, Cruz has extensive training in amateur wrestling.

Championships and accomplishments
Ultimate Fighting Championship
UFC Bantamweight Championship (Two times; inaugural)
Three successful title defenses (two during first reign, one during second reign)
Fight of the Night (Four times) vs. Urijah Faber, T.J. Dillashaw, Cody Garbrandt and Pedro Munhoz.
Performance of the Night (One time) vs. Takeya Mizugaki
Most wins in UFC/WEC Bantamweight History (14)
Tied with T.J. Dillashaw and Aljamain Sterling for the most consecutive Bantamweight title defenses in UFC history. - (2) 
World Extreme Cagefighting
WEC Bantamweight Championship (One time, final)
Two successful title defenses
Fight of the Night (One time) vs. Joseph Benavidez
Total Combat
Total Combat Lightweight Championship
Total Combat Featherweight Championship
USA Today
2010 Fighter of the Year
World MMA Awards
2014 Comeback Fighter of the Year
2015 Analyst of the Year
2016 Analyst of the Year
2017 Analyst of the Year

Mixed martial arts record

|-
|Loss
|align=center|24–4
|Marlon Vera
|KO (head kick)
|UFC on ESPN: Vera vs. Cruz
|
|align=center|4
|align=center|2:17
|San Diego, California, United States
|
|-
|Win
|align=center|24–3
|Pedro Munhoz
|Decision (unanimous)
|UFC 269
|
|align=center|3
|align=center|5:00
|Las Vegas, Nevada, United States
|
|-
|Win
|align=center|23–3
|Casey Kenney
|Decision (split)
|UFC 259
|
|align=center|3
|align=center|5:00
|Las Vegas, Nevada, United States
|
|-
|Loss
|align=center|22–3
|Henry Cejudo
|TKO (knee and punches)
|UFC 249
|
|align=center|2
|align=center|4:58
|Jacksonville, Florida, United States
|
|-
|Loss
|align=center|22–2
|Cody Garbrandt
|Decision (unanimous)
|UFC 207
|
|align=center|5
|align=center|5:00
|Las Vegas, Nevada, United States
|
|-
|Win
|align=center|22–1
|Urijah Faber
|Decision (unanimous)
|UFC 199
|
|align=center|5
|align=center|5:00
|Inglewood, California, United States
|
|-
|Win
|align=center|21–1
|T.J. Dillashaw
|Decision (split)
|UFC Fight Night: Dillashaw vs. Cruz
| 
|align=center|5
|align=center|5:00
|Boston, Massachusetts, United States
|
|-
| Win
| align=center| 20–1
| Takeya Mizugaki
| KO (punches)
| UFC 178
| 
| align=center| 1
| align=center| 1:01
| Las Vegas, Nevada, United States
| 
|-
| Win
| align=center| 19–1
| Demetrious Johnson
| Decision (unanimous)
| UFC Live: Cruz vs. Johnson
| 
| align=center| 5
| align=center| 5:00
| Washington D.C., United States
| 
|-
| Win
| align=center| 18–1
| Urijah Faber
| Decision (unanimous)
| UFC 132
| 
| align=center| 5
| align=center| 5:00
| Las Vegas, Nevada, United States
| 
|-
| Win
| align=center| 17–1
| Scott Jorgensen
| Decision (unanimous)
| WEC 53
| 
| align=center| 5
| align=center| 5:00
| Glendale, Arizona, United States
| 
|-
| Win
| align=center| 16–1
| Joseph Benavidez
| Decision (split)
| WEC 50
| 
| align=center| 5
| align=center| 5:00
| Las Vegas, Nevada, United States
| 
|-
| Win
| align=center| 15–1
| Brian Bowles
| TKO (doctor stoppage)
| WEC 47
| 
| align=center| 2
| align=center| 5:00
| Columbus, Ohio, United States
| 
|-
| Win
| align=center| 14–1
| Joseph Benavidez
| Decision (unanimous)
| WEC 42
| 
| align=center| 3
| align=center| 5:00
| Las Vegas, Nevada, United States
| 
|-
| Win
| align=center| 13–1
| Iván López
| Technical Decision (unanimous)
| WEC 40
| 
| align=center| 3
| align=center| 3:24
| Chicago, Illinois, United States
| 
|-
| Win
| align=center| 12–1
| Ian McCall
| Decision (unanimous)
| WEC 38
| 
| align=center| 3
| align=center| 5:00
| San Diego, California, United States
| 
|-
| Win
| align=center| 11–1
| Charlie Valencia
| Decision (unanimous)
| WEC 34
| 
| align=center| 3
| align=center| 5:00
| Sacramento, California, United States
| 
|-
| Win
| align=center| 10–1
| Kenneth Aimes
| KO (punches)
| Total Combat 27
| 
| align=center| 1
| align=center| N/A
| Yuma, Arizona, United States
| 
|-
| Loss
| align=center| 9–1
| Urijah Faber
| Submission (guillotine choke)
| WEC 26
| 
| align=center| 1
| align=center| 1:38
| Las Vegas, Nevada, United States
| 
|-
| Win
| align=center| 9–0
| Shad Smith
| Decision (unanimous)
| Total Combat 18
| 
| align=center| 3
| align=center| 5:00
| San Diego, California, United States
| 
|-
| Win
| align=center| 8–0
| Juan Miranda
| Submission (rear-naked choke)
| Total Combat 16
| 
| align=center| 1
| align=center| 4:00
| San Diego, California, United States
| 
|-
| Win
| align=center| 7–0
| Dave Hisquierdo
| Decision (split)
| Total Combat 15
| 
| align=center| 3
| align=center| 5:00
| San Diego, California, United States
| 
|-
| Win
| align=center| 6–0
| Michael Barney
| TKO (punches)
| Rage in the Cage 79
| 
| align=center| 1
| align=center| 2:45
| Tucson, Arizona, United States
| 
|-
| Win
| align=center| 5–0
| Nick Hedrick
| Decision (unanimous)
| Rage in the Cage 75
| 
| align=center| 3
| align=center| 2:00
| Glendale, Arizona, United States
| 
|-
| Win
| align=center| 4–0
| Josh Donahue
| TKO (punches)
| Rage in the Cage 74
| 
| align=center| 2
| align=center| 1:09
| Casa Grande, Arizona, United States
| 
|-
| Win
| align=center| 3–0
| Tom Schwager
| TKO (punches)
| Rage in the Cage 73
| 
| align=center| 1
| align=center| 0:56
| Glendale, Arizona, United States
| 
|-
| Win
| align=center| 2–0
| Rosco McClellan
| TKO (punches)
| Rage in the Cage 70
| 
| align=center| 2
| align=center| 1:26
| Glendale, Arizona, United States
| 
|-
| Win
| align=center| 1–0
| Eddie Castro
| Decision (split)
| Rage in the Cage 67
| 
| align=center| 3
| align=center| 3:00
| Phoenix, Arizona, United States
|

Pay-per-view bouts

See also
 List of current UFC fighters
 List of male mixed martial artists
 Ultimate Fighting Championship Pound for Pound rankings

References

External links
UFC Profile

Living people
American male mixed martial artists
Mixed martial artists from California
American mixed martial artists of Mexican descent
American practitioners of Brazilian jiu-jitsu
Bantamweight mixed martial artists
Mixed martial artists utilizing wrestling
Mixed martial artists utilizing Brazilian jiu-jitsu
Ultimate Fighting Championship champions
World Extreme Cagefighting champions
Sportspeople from Tucson, Arizona
Sportspeople from Chula Vista, California
Ultimate Fighting Championship male fighters
1985 births